Ahmadabad-e Bala may refer to:
 Ahmadabad-e Bala, Bushehr
 Ahmadabad-e Bala, East Azerbaijan
 Ahmadabad-e Bala, Kermanshah
 Ahmadabad-e Bala, West Azerbaijan

See also
 Ahmadabad-e Olya (disambiguation)